Seyyed Mohammad (also Romanized as Seyyed Moḩammad) is a village in Jowzar Rural District, in the Central District of Mamasani County, Fars Province, Iran. At the 2006 census, its population was 190, in 40 families.

References 

Populated places in Mamasani County